Lars Sandberg (born 25 June 1957) is a Swedish former footballer. He made 49 Allsvenskan appearances for Djurgården.

References

1957 births
Living people
Swedish footballers
Allsvenskan players
Djurgårdens IF Fotboll players
Association footballers not categorized by position